Apichet Petchmanee (born 24 October 1989) is a Thai professional boxer who has held the WBC-ABC lightweight title since 2019.

Professional boxing record

References

External links

Apichet Petchmanee
Living people
1989 births
Apichet Petchmanee
Lightweight boxers